Lamougin is a local drink that is mainly made with ginger and rice. It is very popular in the northern part of Ghana and some parts of southern Ghana. It is also known as 'Hausa beer'.

Ingredients 

 Ginger
 Rice or Millet
 Vanilla essence (optional)
 Cloves (pepper)
 Water
 Sugar
 Tamarind also known as 'Samia' in Hausa language.

Method of preparation 

 Soak the rice or millet overnight (uncooked) to soften it.
 Strain off the water and blend the rice or millet,
 Add water, pepre (cloves), and ginger and blend together
 Sift, add sugar and stir.

Uses 
It's suitable for all occasions and time.

References 

Food and drink in Ghana